Huayuan (华苑小区) is a  town of Nankai District, Tianjin, China, which has a population of 70,000.

References

Towns in Tianjin